Cape Langeron is a cape in the central part of the Gulf of Odessa. It is located in the centrum of the City of Odessa. The cape is named after Count Louis Alexandre Andrault de Langeron, the summer residence was located on this cape.

Langeron